Metria is a genus of moths in the family Erebidae. The genus was erected by Jacob Hübner in 1823.

Species
 Metria amella (Guenée, 1852) – live oak metria moth
 Metria bilineata (J. B. Smith, 1899)
 Metria celia (Cramer, 1782)

References

Omopterini
Moth genera